The Redneck Fishing Tournament is an annual event held on a channel of the Illinois River near the community of Bath, Illinois.

The event is typically held during the first weekend in August and is specifically intended to decrease the population of silver carp, a species of Asian carp, in the river. The fish is an invasive species in the midwestern United States and has become a nuisance in various waterways over the last twenty years, competing for food with native fish. Their size is of particular note, because the fish respond to vibrations from motors as boats move through water by jumping out of the water, potentially hitting and injuring boaters.

History
Silver carp were among several species imported to the United States, notably to Arkansas, in the 1970s as a way to reduce algae in commercial fishing ponds. Flooding events along the Mississippi River and its tributaries during the 1980s are commonly considered to have been what allowed the fish to escape those commercial ponds and make their way into rivers, other ponds, and lakes. 

The first officially recognized event was held in 2005 and attracted an estimated two hundred participants. Media attention grew, bringing in more participants the following year. Participants in the tournament have come from as far away as Europe and Asia. Participants in the tournament board boats and travel the river for two hours at a time, using various types of fishing nets to catch the fish as they jump out of the water. No fishing poles are allowed in the tournament, and releasing any fish that are caught back into the river is prohibited. The fish that are caught during the tournament are used for various purposes ranging from scientific research to ingredients in fertilizer and cat food, to, in some cases, human consumption. 

The 2018 tournament resulted in over 5,300 fish being removed from the river, while previous tournaments have caught as many as 10,600.

In recent years, proceeds from the event have been donated to charities in the area.

Because of flooding & the COVID-19 pandemic, the tournament was on hiatus until 2021.

References

External links
Official website

Fishing tournaments
Annual sporting events in the United States
Annual events in Illinois